The white-headed vanga (Artamella viridis) is a species of bird in the family Vangidae. It is monotypic within the genus Artamella. It is endemic to Madagascar, where its natural habitats are subtropical or tropical dry forest, subtropical or tropical moist lowland forest, and subtropical or tropical moist montane forest.

Taxonomy and systematics

Former Species
Formerly, some authorities also considered the black-and-crimson oriole to be a species within the genus Artamella.

References

white-headed vanga
Endemic birds of Madagascar
white-headed vanga
Taxonomy articles created by Polbot